Eugène de Mazenod (born Charles-Joseph-Eugène de Mazenod; 1 August 1782 – 21 May 1861) was a French aristocrat and Catholic priest. When he was eight years old, Mazenod's family fled the French Revolution, leaving their considerable wealth behind. As refugees in Italy, they were poor, and moved from place to place. He returned to France at the age of twenty and later became a priest. Mazenod founded the congregation of the Missionary Oblates of Mary Immaculate. Initially focused on rebuilding the Church in France after the Revolution, their work soon spread, particularly to Canada. Mazenod was appointed Bishop of Marseille in 1837, and Archbishop in 1851.

Bishop de Mazenod was beatified on October 19, 1975, and was canonized twenty years later on 3 December 1995.  The Catholic  Church commemorates him with an optional memorial on 21 May, the anniversary of his death.

Three schools are named for him, in the Australian cities of Brisbane, Perth and Melbourne.

Biography

Refugee
Eugène de Mazenod was born on 1 August 1782 and baptized the following day in the Église de la Madeleine in Aix-en-Provence. His father, Charles Antoine de Mazenod, was one of the Presidents of the Court of Finances, and his mother was Marie Rose Joannis. Eugène began his schooling at the College Bourbon, but this was interrupted by the events of the French Revolution. With the approach of the French revolutionary forces, the family  fled to Italy.

Eugène became a boarder at the College of Nobles in Turin (Piedmont), but a move to Venice meant the end to formal schooling. With their money running out, Eugène's father sought various employments, none of which were successful. His mother and sister returned to France - eventually seeking a divorce so as to be able to regain their  seized property. Eugène was fortunate to be welcomed by the Zinelli family in Venice. One of their sons, the priest Bartolo Zinelli, took special care of Eugène and saw to his education in the well-provided family library where the young adolescent spent many hours each day. Don Bartolo was a major influence in the human, academic and spiritual development of Eugène.

Once again the French army chased the émigrés  from Venice, forcing Eugène and his father and two uncles to seek refuge in Naples for less than a year, and finally to flee to Palermo in Sicily. Here Eugène was invited to become part of the household of the Duke and Duchess of Cannizaro as a companion to their two sons. Being part of the high society of Sicily became the opportunity for Eugène to rediscover his noble origins and to live a lavish style of life. He took to himself the title of 'Comte' ("Count") de Mazenod, did all the courtly things, and dreamed of a bright future.

Conversion
At the age of twenty, Eugène returned to France and lived with his mother in Aix en Provence. Initially he enjoyed all the pleasures of Aix as a rich young nobleman, intent on the pursuit of pleasure and money - and a rich girl who would bring a good dowry. Gradually he became aware of how empty his life was, and began to search for meaning in more regular church involvement, reading and personal study, and charitable work among prisoners. His journey came to a climax on Good Friday, 1807 when he was 25 years old. Looking at the sight of the Cross, he had a religious experience.  He recounted the spiritual experience in his retreat journal: Can I forget the bitter tears that the sight of the cross brought streaming from my eyes one Good Friday? Indeed they welled up from the heart, there was no checking them, they were too abundant for me to be able to hide them from those who like myself were assisting at that moving ceremony. I was in a state of mortal sin and it was precisely this that made me grieve…Blessed, a thousand times blessed, that he, this good Father, notwithstanding my unworthiness, lavished on me all the richness of his mercy.

Priest
In 1808, he began his studies for the priesthood at the Saint-Sulpice Seminary in Paris and was ordained a priest at Amiens (Picardy), on 21 December 1811. Since Napoleon had expelled the Sulpician priests from the seminary, Eugène stayed on as a formator for a semester. As a member of the Seminary, notwithstanding personal risk, Eugène committed himself to serve and assist Pope Pius VII, who at this time was a prisoner of emperor Napoleon I at Fontainebleau. In this way he experienced at firsthand the suffering of the post-Revolutionary Church.

On his return to Aix, Father de Mazenod asked not to be assigned to a parish but to dedicate himself fully to evangelizing those who were not being reached by the structures of the local church: the poor who spoke only the Provençal language, prisoners, youth, the inhabitants of poor villages who were ignorant of their faith. The goal of his priestly preaching and ministry was always to lead others to develop themselves fully as humans, then as Christians and finally to become saints.

Founder

Oblates of Mary Immaculate
On 25  January 1816, "impelled by a strong impulse from outside of himself" he invited other priests to join him in his life of total oblation to God and to the most abandoned of Provence. Initially called "Missionaries of Provence," they dedicated themselves to evangelization through preaching parish missions in the poor villages, youth and prison ministry. In 1818 a second community was established at the Marian shrine of Notre Dame du Laus. This became the occasion for the missionaries to become a religious congregation, united through vows and the evangelical counsels. Changing their name to Missionary Oblates of Mary Immaculate, the group received papal approbation on 17 February 1826.

Foreign Missions
In 1841, Bishop Bourget of Montreal invited the Oblates to Canada. At the same time, there was an outreach to the British Isles. This was the beginning of a history of missionary outreach to the most abandoned peoples in Canada, United States, Mexico, England and Ireland, Algeria, Southern Africa and Ceylon during the founder's lifetime. In 200 years this zeal spread and took root in the establishment of the Oblates in nearly 70 countries.

Bishop
After having aided for some time his uncle, the aged Bishop of Marseilles, in the administration of his diocese, Father De Mazenod was called to Rome and, on 14 October 1832, consecrated titular Bishop of Icosium, which title in 1837 he exchanged for that of Bishop of Marseilles, a position he held until his death in 1861. During his episcopacy, he commissioned Notre-Dame de la Garde, an ornate Neo-Byzantine basilica on the south side of the old port of Marseille. He favoured the moral teachings of Alphonsus Liguori, whose theological system he was the first to introduce in France, and whose first biography in French he caused to be written by one of the Oblates.

He inspired local priest Joseph-Marie Timon-David to found the Congregation of the Sacred Heart of Jesus in Marseille in 1852.

In spite of his well-known outspokenness, he was made a Peer of the French Empire, and in 1851 Pope Pius IX gave him the pallium.

Veneration 
Some forty-five years after his death, the Diocese of Marseille opened a three-year-long investigation for the cause for Bishop de Mazenod's canonization. In 1935, the cause was opened by the Sacred Congregation of Rites at the Vatican. In May 1970, the Congregation for the Causes of Saints recognized the heroic virtue of Eugène's life, and he was proclaimed "venerable".

Five years later, after the same congregation attributed miracles of healing to Eugène's intercession, and, following that, Pope Paul VI beatified Bishop de Mazenod in Rome on 19 October 1975.

In December 1994, the Congregation for Saints approved another miracle attributed to Blessed Eugène's intercession; John Paul II celebrated his Mass of canonization in 1995, on 3 December. In his homily at the Mass, celebrated on the First Sunday of Advent, the Pope proclaimed Saint Eugène a "Man of Advent", saying:Eugène de Mazenod, whom the Church today proclaims a saint, was a man of Advent, a man of the Coming. He not only looked forward to that Coming, but... he dedicated his whole life to preparing for it. His waiting reached the intensity of heroism, that is, it was marked by a heroic degree of faith, hope and apostolic charity. Eugène de Mazenod was one of those apostles who prepared the modern age, our age.

References

External links

Who is Eugène de Mazenod?
JEAN LEFLON, Eugène de Mazenod. Bishop of Marseilles, Founder of the Oblates of Mary Immaculate. 1782-1861. Vol. 1
J. Leflon Eugène de Mazenod.... Vol. 3
J. Leflon Eugène de Mazenod.... Vol. 4
F. SANTUCCI, Eugène de Mazenod, Cooperator of Christ the Saviour, Communicates his Spirit

Biography of Eugène de Mazenod at OMI Lacombe
Biography of St. Eugène de Mazenod from American Catholic.org
Biography of St. Eugène de Mazenod from the Oblate Missions Website of National Shrine of Our Lady of the Snows website of The Missionary Oblates of Mary Immaculate

1782 births
1861 deaths
Founders of Catholic religious communities
Bishops of Marseille
French Roman Catholic saints
19th-century French Roman Catholic bishops
Missionary Oblates of Mary Immaculate
Beatifications by Pope Paul VI
Canonizations by Pope John Paul II
Venerated Catholics by Pope Paul VI